ROCS Ta Kuan (AGS-1601) is a Taiwanese Navy research vessel. Designed to carry out oceanographic and hydrographic research, as well as surveillance activities, the vessel's platform was developed from the  built for NATO.

Design
She is a sister ship of Alliance and  being built in between the two.

History
Ta Kuan was built at La Spezia, Italy by Fincantieri and was launched in 1995. In 2015 she received a full upgrade from L3 Technologies.

References 

Ships built in Italy
Ships built by Fincantieri
Research vessels